Anna of Hungary may refer to:

 Anna of Hungary, Duchess of Macsó (born 1226), daughter of Bela IV of Hungary, wife of prince Rostislav Mikhailovich
 Anna of Hungary (Byzantine empress) ( 1260–1281), daughter of Stephen V of Hungary, first wife of Andronikos II Palaiologos
 Anne, Duchess of Luxembourg (1432–1462), daughter of Albert II of Germany, wife of her co-ruler William III, Duke of Luxembourg
 Anna of Bohemia and Hungary (1503–1547), daughter of Vladislaus II of Bohemia and Hungary, wife of Ferdinand I, Holy Roman Emperor
 Archduchess Anna of Austria (1528–1590), daughter of Anna of Bohemia and Hungary, wife of Albert V, Duke of Bavaria
 Anna of Austria (1549–1580), daughter of Maximilian II, Holy Roman Emperor, king of Hungary, fourth wife of Philip II of Spain
 Anna of Tyrol (1585–1618), daughter of Ferdinand II, Archduke of Further Austria, wife of Matthias, Holy Roman Emperor, king of Hungary